Marcos Antonio Hernández Rodríguez (born November 1, 1978 in Varadero, Matanzas) is a former international freestyle swimmer from Cuba, who participated in two consecutive Summer Olympics for his native country, starting in 2000. He won the bronze medal in the Men's 50m Freestyle at the 1999 Pan American Games.

External links

1978 births
Living people
Cuban male freestyle swimmers
Swimmers at the 1999 Pan American Games
Swimmers at the 2003 Pan American Games
Swimmers at the 2000 Summer Olympics
Swimmers at the 2004 Summer Olympics
Olympic swimmers of Cuba
Pan American Games bronze medalists for Cuba
Pan American Games medalists in swimming
Universiade medalists in swimming
Central American and Caribbean Games gold medalists for Cuba
Competitors at the 1998 Central American and Caribbean Games
Universiade gold medalists for Cuba
Central American and Caribbean Games medalists in swimming
Medalists at the 1997 Summer Universiade
Medalists at the 1999 Pan American Games
People from Varadero
20th-century Cuban people
21st-century Cuban people